The Armory of the Kentish Guards is a historic armory at Armory and Peirce Streets in East Greenwich, Rhode Island and is currently home to the Kentish Guards, a historic Rhode Island Independent Military Organization.

History

The Kentish Guards were founded in 1774, just prior to the American Revolution. The Greek Revival armory building was constructed in 1843 with a $1,000 public grant from the Rhode Island General Assembly to the Kentish Guards for their aid in the Dorr Rebellion in 1842.  In 1970 the building was added to the National Register of Historic Places.

Collections
The Armory contains a gallery of pictures featuring former members of the Guard.  The original charter hangs on the wall as a lasting reminder and a memorial to those men who organized the Kentish Guards in 1774.

Visiting
The Kentish Guards Armory may be visited on Tuesdays, when the militia company meets, and Wednesdays, when the fife & drum rehearses, both around 8:00 pm (except during holiday periods) and by special appointment. Visit www.kentishguards.org for more information.

Notable Kentish Guards
James Mitchell Varnum, Colonel and First Commander of the Kentish Guards, general during American Revolution
Nathanael Greene, private in the Kentish Guards (rank limited due to a limp and lack of formal education), Major General during American Revolution
Christopher Greene, legislator, soldier

See also

 Artillery Company of Newport
 Col. Micah Whitmarsh House
 National Register of Historic Places listings in Kent County, Rhode Island
 Rhode Island Naval Militia
 Rhode Island State Guard

References

External links
Kentish Guards Website

Government buildings completed in 1843
Infrastructure completed in 1843
Military facilities on the National Register of Historic Places in Rhode Island
Armories on the National Register of Historic Places in Rhode Island
Buildings and structures in East Greenwich, Rhode Island
1843 establishments in Rhode Island
National Register of Historic Places in Kent County, Rhode Island
Historic district contributing properties in Rhode Island